The 2001 Laval municipal election took place on November 4, 2001, to elect a mayor and city councillors in Laval, Quebec.

Gilles Vaillancourt was elected to a fourth term as mayor, and his municipal party won every seat on city council.

Results

Mayor

Council

Source: ÉLECTION MUNICIPALE DU 4 NOVEMBRE 2001, City of Laval.

References

2001 Quebec municipal elections
2001
November 2001 events in Canada